The Eurasian pygmy shrew (Sorex minutus), often known simply as the pygmy shrew, is a widespread shrew of the northern Palearctic.

Description
The muzzle and legs are covered with sparse white hair (vibrissae in the muzzle ), while the skin is flesh colored: the ears are small and half hidden by the hair, they are dark flesh colored and shaped like a semicircle.In this species the head is larger in proportion to the body than in other shrews.
It may be confused with Eurasian least shrew and the Etruscan shrew.

Behaviour

Eurasian pygmy shrews are solitary animals, active throughout the day and night and inhabiting areas of dense vegetation across a broad elevation range. It lives off seeds, small insects and other invertebrates.  They use the burrows or tunnels of other rodents to live in, alone they burrow under tree stumps.They have many predators. The whole life is spent on a few hundred square metres where they establish trackways.The Eurasian pygmy shrew has one of the highest metabolic rates of any animal; to maintain homeostasis, it must eat every two hours. Due to this, it eats up to 125% of its body weight (about four grams) each day.
They are active for 24 hours per day in very short periods interspersed with sleep (say 15 minutes
activity 15 minutes sleep)

Breeding
The breeding season lasts from April through to August. Females usually produce between two and eight young per litter and care for the young in an underground nest. Since the gestation period is just over three weeks, they can have up to five litters in one year, though the life span of a pygmy shrew is a little over 15 months.

References
Content in this edit is translated from the existing Italian Wikipedia article at :it:Sorex minutus; see its history for attribution.

External links

Eurasian pygmy shrew
Mammals of Asia
Mammals of Europe
Mammals of Turkey
Mammals of Russia
Mammals of Central Asia
Eurasian pygmy shrew
Eurasian pygmy shrew